Adolf Zethelius (born Erik Adolf Zethelius; 19 February 17817 March 7, 1864) was a Swedish silversmith and industrialist and owner of the Swedish ironworks Surahammars bruk and Nyby bruk.

Silversmith
The orb, sceptre and anointing horn which are part of the Norwegian Royal Regalia were commissioned by King Charles John and made by Zethelius in Stockholm  for the King's coronation as King of Norway in 1818.  Works by Zethelius are also exhibited at Nationalmuseum and Hallwyl Palace in Stockholm.

Industrialist
Zethelius acquired the manor house Nyby, near Torshälla, from his father-in-law Eric Nordewall, and in 1829 founded the ironworks Nyby bruk on the site.

Zethelius had the manor house of Surahammars herrgård constructed 1856–1858.

References

Zethelius, Adolf
Zethelius, Adolf
Zethelius, Adolf
Zethelius, Adolf
Zethelius, Adolf